Best of the Best: Championship Karate is a 1992 kick boxing game that features black belt kick boxing masters.  The object is to win the kick boxing championship by defeating an array of kick boxing masters in a series of fighting matches. The Sega Genesis version is one of the few games to offer support for the Sega Activator motion controller.

Best of the Best is an updated version of Panza Kick Boxing which was released in 1990 in Europe for various computers as well as the TurboGrafx-16.

Martial artist/actor Ron Yuan stated in a 1994 interview that "I know a lot of pure gamers will disagree, but the best SNES fighting game from a purely technical martial arts point of view is Best of the Best. It didn't get much notoriety, but my friends and I know martial arts, and they go nuts whenever we play."

Reception
Juris Graney of The Australian Commodore & Amiga Review compared Best of the Best to its predecessor: "Best of the Best Championship Karate is almost a reproduction of my old favourite, Panza Kick Boxing. In fact, it's the sequel, subtitled Panza Gold Edition. Everything is the same – the crowd, the referee, the moves and everything else. The only difference is an advanced stage at the end."

References

External links

Best of the Best: Championship Karate at the Hall of Light

1992 video games
Fighting games
Amiga games
Amstrad CPC games
DOS games
Electro Brain games
Game Boy games
Muay Thai video games
Multiplayer and single-player video games
Nintendo Entertainment System games
Sega Genesis games
Super Nintendo Entertainment System games
Video games developed in France
Virtual Studio games